This list of non-marine molluscs of Germany is a list of the molluscs that live in Germany, excluding the marine (saltwater) species. In other words, it includes the land snails and slugs, the freshwater snails and the freshwater clams and mussels.

There are about 349 species of non-marine mollusc living in the wild in Germany. Of these, 70 species are freshwater gastropods and 39 species are bivalves. There are 45 introduced gastropod species (6 freshwater and 36 land species) and 3 introduced bivalve species living in the wild in Germany.

Summary table of number of species

Some non-indigenous species only occurring greenhouses in Germany are noted separately, below the list.

The main source for the list of freshwater species is the book Süsswassermollusken by Glöer & Meier-Brook.

Freshwater gastropods
Neritidae
 Theodoxus danubialis (C. Pfeiffer, 1828)
 Theodoxus fluviatilis (Linnaeus, 1758) – and Theodoxus fluviatilis littoralis (Linnaeus, 1758)
 Theodoxus transversalis (C. Pfeiffer, 1828)

Viviparidae
 Viviparus ater (Christofori & Jan, 1832)
 Viviparus acerosus (Bourguignat, 1862)
 Viviparus contectus (Millet, 1813)
 Viviparus viviparus (Linnaeus, 1758) – and Viviparus viviparus penthicus (Servain, 1884)

Hydrobiidae
 Potamopyrgus antipodarum (Gray, 1843) – non-indigenous
 Bythiospeum acicula (Held, 1838)
 Bythiospeum quenstedti (von Wiedersheim, 1873)
 Bythiospeum sandbergeri (Flach, 1886)
 Sadleriana bavarica Boeters, 1989
 Avenionia roberti Boeters, 1967

Lithoglyphidae
 Lithoglyphus naticoides (C. Pfeiffer, 1828)

Amnicolidae
 Marstoniopsis scholtzi (A. Schmidt, 1856)
 Bythinella austriaca (von Frauenfeld, 1857)
 Bythinella badensis (Boeters, 1981)
 Bythinella bavarica (Clessin, 1877)
 Bythinella compressa (von Frauenfeld, 1857)
 Bythinella dunkeri (von Frauenfeld, 1857)
 Emmericia patula (Brumati, 1838)

Bithyniidae
 Bithynia leachii (Sheppard, 1823)
 Bithynia tentaculata (Linnaeus, 1758)
 Bithynia troschelii (Paasch, 1842)

Valvatidae
 Borysthenia naticina (Menke, 1845)
 Valvata ambigua Westerlund, 1873
 Valvata cristata O.F. Müller, 1774
 Valvata macrostoma Mörch, 1864
 Valvata piscinalis (O.F. Müller, 1774)
 Valvata studeri Boeters & Falkner, 1998

Acroloxidae
 Acroloxus lacustris (Linnaeus, 1758)

Lymnaeidae
 Galba truncatula (O.F. Müller, 1774)
 Stagnicola occultus (Jackiewicz, 1959) – synonym: Catascopia occulta (Jackiewicz, 1959)
 Stagnicola corvus (Gmelin, 1791)
 Stagnicola fuscus (C. Pfeiffer, 1821)
 Stagnicola palustris (O.F. Müller, 1774)
 Stagnicola turricula (Held, 1836)
 Omphiscola glabra (O.F. Müller, 1774)
 Radix ampla (Hartmann, 1821)
 Radix auricularia (Linnaeus, 1758)
 Radix balthica (Linnaeus, 1758) – synonym: Radix ovata (Draparnaud, 1805)
 Radix peregra (O.F. Müller, 1774) – synonym:: Radix labiata (Rossmässler, 1835)
 Myxas glutinosa (O.F. Müller, 1774)
 Lymnaea stagnalis (Linnaeus, 1758)

Physidae
 Aplexa hypnorum (Linnaeus, 1758)
 Physa fontinalis (Linnaeus, 1758)
 Physella acuta (Draparnaud, 1805) – non-indigenous, synonym: Physella heterostropha (Say, 1817)

Planorbidae
 Planorbis carinatus O.F. Müller, 1774
 Planorbis planorbis (Linnaeus, 1758)
 Anisus calculiformis (Sandberger, 1874)
 Anisus leucostoma (Millet, 1813)
 Anisus spirorbis (Linnaeus, 1758)
 Anisus vortex (Linnaeus, 1758)
 Anisus vorticulus (Troschel, 1834)
 Bathyomphalus contortus (Linnaeus, 1758)
 Gyraulus acronicus (A. Férussac, 1807)
 Gyraulus albus (O.F. Müller, 1774)
 Gyraulus crista (Linnaeus, 1758)
 Gyraulus chinensis (Dunker, 1848)  – non-indigenous, in Magdeburg lowland(?)
 Gyraulus laevis (Alder, 1838)
 Gyraulus parvus (Say, 1817) – non-indigenous
 Gyraulus riparius (Westerlund, 1865)
 Gyraulus rossmaessleri (Auerswald, 1852)
 Hippeutis complanatus (Linnaeus, 1758)
 Segmentina nitida (O.F. Müller, 1774)
 Planorbarius corneus (Linnaeus, 1758)
 Planorbella duryi (Wetherby, 1879) – non-indigenous, one appearance in Rhineland
 Menetus dilatatus (Gould, 1841) – non-indigenous
 Ancylus fluviatilis O.F. Müller, 1774
 Ferrissia fragilis (Tryon, 1863) – non-indigenous

Land gastropods
Aciculidae
 Acicula fusca (Montagu, 1803)
 Acicula lineata (Draparnaud, 1801)
 Acicula lineolata (Pini, 1884)
 Platyla gracilis (Clessin, 1877)
 Platyla polita (W. Hartmann, 1840)
 Renea veneta (Pirona, 1865)

Cochlostomatidae
 Cochlostoma septemspirale (Razoumowsky, 1789)

Pomatiidae
 Pomatias elegans (O.F. Müller, 1774)

Assimineidae
 Assiminea grayana Fleming, 1828

Ellobiidae
 Myosotella myosotis (Draparnaud, 1801)
 Leucophytia bidentata (Montagu, 1808)

Carychiidae
 Carychium minimum O.F. Müller, 1774
 Carychium tridentatum (Risso, 1826)

Succineidae
 Oxyloma elegans (Risso, 1826)
 Oxyloma sarsii (Esmark, 1886)
 Quickella arenaria (Potiez & Michaud, 1835)
 Succinea putris Linnaeus, 1758
 Succinella oblonga (Draparnaud, 1801)

Azecidae
 Azeca goodalli (Férussac, 1821)

Cochlicopidae
 Cochlicopa lubrica (O.F. Müller, 1774)
 Cochlicopa lubricella (Rossmässler, 1834)
 Cochlicopa nitens (M. von Gallenstein, 1848)

Chondrinidae
 Abida secale (Draparnaud, 1801)
 Chondrina arcadica (Reinhardt, 1881)
 Chondrina avenacea (Bruguière, 1792)
 Granaria frumentum (Draparnaud, 1801)

Lauriidae
 Lauria cylindracea (da Costa, 1778)

Orculidae
 Orcula dolium (Draparnaud, 1801)
 Orcula gularis (Rossmässler, 1837)
 Pagodulina pagodula (Desmoulins, 1830)
 Sphyradium doliolum (Bruguière, 1792)

Pupillidae
 Pupilla alpicola (Charpentier, 1837) – synonym: Pupilla pratensis (Clessin, 1871)

 Pupilla muscorum (Linnaeus, 1758)

 Pupilla sterrii (Voith, 1840)
 Pupilla triplicata (Studer, 1820)

Pyramidulidae
 Pyramidula pusilla (Vallot, 1801)
 Pyramidula saxatilis (Hartmann, 1842)

Truncatellinidae
 Columella aspera Waldén, 1966
 Columella columella (G.v. Martens, 1830)
 Columella edentula (Draparnaud, 1805)
 Truncatellina algoviana Colling & Karle-Fendt, 2016
 Truncatellina callicratis (Scacchi, 1833)
 Truncatellina claustralis (Gredler, 1856)
 Truncatellina costulata (Nilsson, 1823)
 Truncatellina cylindrica (A. Férussac, 1807)
 Truncatellina monodon (Held, 1837)

Valloniidae
 Acanthinula aculeata (O.F. Müller, 1774)
 Spermodea lamellata Jeffreys, 1830
 Vallonia costata (O.F. Müller, 1774)
 Vallonia declivis Sterki, 1893
 Vallonia enniensis (Gredler, 1856)
 Vallonia excentrica Sterki 1893
 Vallonia pulchella (O.F. Müller, 1774)
 Vallonia suevica Geyer 1908

Vertiginidae
 Vertigo alpestris Alder, 1838
 Vertigo angustior Jeffreys, 1830
 Vertigo antivertigo (Draparnaud, 1801)
 Vertigo genesii (Gredler, 1856) – extinct
 Vertigo geyeri Lindholm, 1925
 Vertigo heldi (Clessin, 1870)
 Vertigo lilljeborgi (Westerlund, 1871)
 Vertigo modesta (Say, 1824)
 Vertigo moulinsiana (Dupuy, 1849)
 Vertigo pusilla O.F. Müller, 1774
 Vertigo pygmaea (Draparnaud, 1801)
 Vertigo ronnebyensis (Westerlund, 1871)
 Vertigo substriata (Jeffreys, 1833)

Enidae
 Ena montana (Draparnaud, 1801)
 Chondrula tridens (O.F. Müller, 1774)
 Jaminia quadridens (O.F. Müller, 1774)
 Merdigera obscura (O.F. Müller, 1774)
 Zebrina detrita (O.F. Müller, 1774)
 Zebrina varnensis (L. Pfeiffer, 1847) – non-indigenous

Clausiliidae
 Alinda biplicata (Montagu, 1805)
 Alopia stramonicollis monacha (M. von Kimakowicz, 1894) – non-indigenous
 Balea perversa (Linnaeus, 1758)
 Bulgarica cana (Held, 1836)
 Bulgarica vetusta (Rossmässler, 1836)
 Charpentieria itala (G. von Martens, 1824) – non-indigenous
 Clausilia bidentata (Strøm, 1765)
 Clausilia cruciata (Studer, 1820)
 Clausilia dubia Draparnaud, 1805
 Clausilia pumila Pfeiffer, 1828
 Clausilia rugosa parvula A. Férussac, 1807
 Cochlodina costata (Pfeiffer, 1828)
 Cochlodina fimbriata (Rossmässler, 1835)
 Cochlodina laminata (Montagu, 1803)
 Cochlodina orthostoma (Menke, 1828)
 Erjavecia bergeri (Rossmässler, 1836)
 Laciniaria plicata (Draparnaud, 1801)
 Macrogastra attenuata lineolata (Held, 1836)
 Macrogastra badia (Pfeiffer, 1828)
 Macrogastra densestriata (Rossmässler, 1836) 
 Macrogastra plicatula (Draparnaud, 1801)
 Macrogastra rolphii (Turton, 1826)
 Macrogastra ventricosa (Draparnaud, 1801)
 Medora almissana (Küster, 1847) – non-indigenous
 Micropontica caucasica (A. Schmidt, 1868) – non-indigenous
 Neostyriaca corynodes (Held, 1836)
 Pseudofusulus varians (C. Pfeiffer, 1828)
 Ruthenica filograna (Rossmässler, 1836)
 Vestia turgida (Rossmässler, 1836) – extinct

Ferussaciidae
 Cecilioides acicula (O.F. Müller, 1774)

Testacellidae
 Testacella haliotidea (Draparnaud, 1801) – non-indigenous

Discidae
 Discus ruderatus (Férussac, 1821)
 Discus rotundatus (O.F. Müller, 1774)
 Discus perspectivus (M. von Mühlfeldt, 1816)

Helicodiscidae
 Lucilla scintilla (R.T. Lowe, 1852) – non-indigenous
 Lucilla singleyana (Pilsbry, 1889) – non-indigenous

Punctidae
 Paralaoma servilis (Shuttleworth, 1852) – non-indigenous
 Punctum pygmaeum (Draparnaud, 1801)

Gastrodontidae
 Zonitoides arboreus (Say, 1816) – non-indigenous
 Zonitoides excavatus (Alder, 1830)
 Zonitoides nitidus (O.F. Müller, 1774)

Euconulidae
 Euconulus alderi (Gray, 1840)
 Euconulus fulvus (O.F. Müller, 1774)

Oxychilidae
 Aegopinella epipedostoma (Fagot, 1879)
 Aegopinella minor (Stabile, 1864)
 Aegopinella nitens (Michaud, 1831)
 Aegopinella nitidula (Draparnaud, 1805)
 Aegopinella pura (Alder, 1830)
 Aegopinella ressmanni (Westerlund, 1883)
 Daudebradia brevipes (Draparnaud, 1805)
 Daudebardia rufa (Draparnaud, 1805)
 Mediterranea depressa (Sterki, 1880)
 Morlina glabra (Rossmässler, 1835)
 Nesovitrea hammonis (Ström, 1765)
 Nesovitrea petronella (L. Pfeiffer, 1853)
 Oxychilus alliarius (J.S. Miller, 1822)
 Oxychilus cellarius (O.F. Müller, 1774)
 Oxychilus clarus (Held, 1838)
 Oxychilus draparnaudi (H. Beck, 1837)
 Oxychilus mortilleti (L. Pfeiffer, 1859)
 Oxychilus navarricus (Bourguignat, 1870)

Pristilomatidae
 Vitrea contracta (Westerlund, 1870)
 Vitrea crystallina (O.F. Müller, 1774)
 Vitrea diaphana (Studer, 1820)
 Vitrea subrimata (Reinhardt, 1870)
 Vitrea transsylvanica (Clessin, 1877)

Milacidae
 Milax gagates (Draparnaud, 1801) – non-indigenous
 Milax nigricans (Philippi, 1836) – non-indigenous
 Tandonia budpestensis (Hazay, 1880) – non-indigenous
 Tandonia ehrmanni (Simroth, 1910)
 Tandonia rustica (Millet, 1843)

Zonitidae
 Aegopis verticillus (Lamarck, 1822)

Limacidae
 Ambigolimax nyctelius (Bourguignat, 1861) – non-indigenous, extinct
 Ambigolimax valentianus (Férussac, 1822) – non-indigenous
 Bielzia coerulans (M. Bielz, 1851) – non-indigenous
 Lehmannia janetscheki Forcart, 1966
 Lehmannia marginata (O.F. Müller, 1774)
 Lehmannia rupicola Lessona & Pollonera, 1882
 Limacus flavus (Linnaeus, 1758) – non-indigenous
 Limacus maculatus (Kaleniczenko 1851) – non-indigenous
 Limax cinereoniger Wolf, 1801
 Limax maximus Linnaeus, 1758
 Malacolimax tenellus (O.F. Müller, 1774)

Agriolimacidae
 Deroceras agreste (Linnaeus, 1758)
 Deroceras invadens Reise, Hutchinson, Schunack & Schlitt, 2013 – non-indigenous
 Deroceras juranum Wüthrich, 1993
 Deroceras klemmi Grossu, 1972 – non-indigenous
 Deroceras laeve (O.F. Müller, 1774)
 Deroceras reticulatum (O.F. Müller, 1774)
 Deroceras sturanyi (Simroth, 1894) – non-indigenous
 Krynickillus melanocephalus Kaleniczenko, 1851 – non-indigenous

Boettgerillidae
 Boettgerilla pallens Simroth, 1912 – non-indigenous

Vitrinidae
 Eucobresia diaphana (Draparnaud, 1805)
 Eucobresia glacialis (Forbes, 1837)
 Eucobresia nivalis (Dummont & Mortillet, 1854)
 Eucobresia pregorarii (Pollonera, 1884)
 Oligolimax annularis (Studer, 1820)
 Phenacolimax major (Férussac, 1807)
 Semilimax kotulae (Westerlund, 1883)
 Semilimax semilimax (Férussac, 1802)
 Vitrina pellucida (O.F. Müller, 1774)
 Vitrinobrachium breve (Férussac, 1821)

Arionidae
 Arion ater (Linnaeus, 1758) s.s. (= Arion ater ater)
 Arion brunneus Lehmann, 1862
 Arion circumscriptus Johnston, 1828
 Arion distinctus Mabille, 1868
 Arion fasciatus (Nilsson, 1823)
 Arion fuscus (O.F. Müller, 1774)
 Arion hortensis (Férussac, 1819)
 Arion intermedius Normand, 1852
 Arion obesoductus Reischütz, 1973 – synonym: Arion alpinus auct. non Pollonera, 1887
 Arion rufus (Linnaeus, 1758) s.l. (= Arion ater rufus + Arion ater ruber)
 Arion silvaticus Lohmander, 1937
 Arion simrothi Künkel, 1909
 Arion subfuscus (Draparnaud, 1805)
 Arion vulgaris Moquin-Tandon, 1855 = Arion lusitanicus auct. non Mabille, 1868 – non-indigenous

Camaenidae
 Fruticicola fruticum (O.F. Müller, 1774)

Geomitridae
 Backeljaia gigaxii (L. Pfeiffer, 1850)
 Candidula intersecta (Poiret, 1801)
 Candidula unifasciata (Poiret, 1801)
 Cernuella cisalpina (Rossmässler, 1837) – non-indigenous
 Cernuella neglecta (Draparnaud, 1805) – non-indigenous
 Cochlicella acuta (O.F. Müller, 1774) – non-indigenous
 Helicella bolenensis (Locard, 1882) – non-indigenous
 Helicella itala (Linnaeus, 1758)
 Helicopsis striata (O.F. Müller, 1774)
 Xerocrassa geyeri (Soós, 1926)
 Xerolenta obvia (Menke, 1828)
 Xerotricha conspurcata (Draparnaud, 1801) – non-indigenous

Helicidae
 Arianta arbustorum (Linnaeus, 1758)
 Caucasotachea vindobonensis (C. Pfeiffer, 1828)
 Causa holoserica (Studer, 1820)
 Cepaea hortensis (O.F. Müller, 1774)
 Cepaea nemoralis (Linnaeus, 1758)
 Chilostoma achates (Rossmässler, 1834)
 Chilostoma cingulatum baldense (Rossmässler, 1839) – non-indigenous
 Chilostoma cingulatum peregrini Falkner, 1998
 Cornu aspersum (O.F. Müller, 1774) – non-indigenous
 Drobacia banatica (Rossmässler, 1838) – non-indigenous
 Faustina illyrica (Stabille, 1884) – non-indigenous
 Helix pomatia (Linnaeus, 1758)
 Helicigona lapicida (Linnaeus, 1758)
 Isognomostoma isognomostomos (Schröter, 1784)
 Macularia sylvatica (Draparnaud, 1801)
 Theba pisana (O.F. Müller, 1774) – non-indigenous

Helicodontidae
 Helicodonta obvoluta (O.F. Müller, 1774)

Hygromiidae
 Euomphalia strigella (Draparnaud, 1801)
 Hygromia cinctella (Draparnaud, 1801) – non-indigenous
 Monacha cantiana (Montagu, 1803)
 Monacha cartusiana (O.F. Müller, 1774)
 Monacha claustralis (Rossmässler, 1834) – non-indigenous
 Monachoides incarnatus (O.F. Müller, 1774)
 Monachoides vicinus (Rossmässler, 1842)
 Perforatella bidentata (Gmelin, 1791)
 Petasina edentula (Draparnaud, 1805)
 Petasina unidentata (Draparnaud, 1805)
 Plicuteria lubomirskii (Ślósarski, 1881)
 Pseudotrichia rubiginosa (Rossmässler, 1838)
 Trochulus alpicola (Eder, 1921)
 Trochulus clandestinus (Hartmann, 1821)
 Trochulus coelomphalus (Locard, 1888)
 Trochulus graminicola (Falkner, 1973)
 Trochulus hispidus (Linnaeus, 1758)
 Trochulus sericeus (Draparnaud, 1801)
 Trochulus striolatus (C. Pfeiffer, 1828)
 Trochulus villosus (Draparnaud, 1805)
 Urticicola umbrosus (C. Pfeiffer, 1828)

Bivalves
Margaritiferidae
 Margaritifera margaritifera (Linnaeus, 1758)

Unionidae
 Unio crassus Philipsson, 1788 – Unio crassus crassus, Unio crassus nanus, Unio crassus cytherea
 Unio mancus Lamarck, 1819
 Unio pictorum (Linnaeus, 1758)
 Unio tumidus Philipsson, 1788
 Anodonta anatina (Linnaeus, 1758)
 Anodonta cygnea (Linnaeus, 1758)
 Pseudanodonta complanata (Rossmässler, 1835) – Pseudanodonta complanata elongata, Pseudanodonta complanata klettii, Pseudanodonta complanata küsteri
 Sinanodonta woodiana (Lea, 1834) – non-indigenous

Corbiculidae

 Corbicula fluminalis (O.F. Müller, 1774)
 Corbicula fluminea (O.F. Müller, 1774)

Sphaeriidae
 Sphaerium corneum (Linnaeus, 1758)
 Sphaerium nucleus (S. Studer, 1820)
 Sphaerium ovale (A. Férussac, 1807)
 Sphaerium rivicola (Lamarck, 1818)
 Sphaerium solidum (Normand, 1844)
 Musculium lacustre (O.F. Müller, 1774)
 Musculium transversum (Say, 1829)
 Pisidium amnicum (O.F. Müller, 1774)
 Pisidium casertanum (Poli, 1791)
 Pisidium conventus (Clessin, 1877)

 Pisidium henslowanum (Sheppard, 1823)
 Pisidium hibernicum Westerlund, 1894
 Pisidium interstitiale Bössneck, Groh & Richling, 2020 – endemic to Germany
 Pisidium lilljeborgii (Clessin, 1886)
 Pisidium milium Held, 1836
 Pisidium moitessierianum Paladilhe, 1866
 Pisidium nitidum Jenyns, 1832
 Pisidium obtusale (Lamarck, 1818)
 Pisidium personatum Malm, 1855
 Pisidium pulchellum (Jenyns, 1832)
 Pisidium pseudosphaerium Favre, 1927
 Pisidium subtruncatum Malm, 1855
 Pisidium supinum A. Schmidt, 1851
 Pisidium tenuilineatum Stelfox, 1918

Dreissenidae
 Congeria leucophaeata (Conrad, 1831) – synonym: Mytilopsis leucophaeata (Conrad, 1831)
 Dreissena polymorpha (Pallas, 1771) – non-indigenous
 Dreissena bugensis (Andrusov, 1897) – non-indigenous

List of hot-house alens in Germany
These species have not been recorded in the wild; they live in greenhouses and similar habitats.

Listed alphabetically according to the scientific name:
 Hawaiia minuscula (Binney, 1840)
 Melanoides tuberculata (O.F. Müller, 1774)

See also
Lists of molluscs of surrounding countries:
 List of non-marine molluscs of Poland
 List of non-marine molluscs of the Czech Republic
 List of non-marine molluscs of Austria
 List of non-marine molluscs of Switzerland
 List of non-marine molluscs of France
 List of non-marine molluscs of Luxembourg
 List of non-marine molluscs of Belgium
 List of non-marine molluscs of the Netherlands
 List of non-marine molluscs of Denmark

References

Further reading
  Glöer P. & Meier-Brook C. (2003) Süsswassermollusken. DJN, pp. 134, p. 109, 
 Stephan Gollasch & Stefan Nehring. National checklist for aquatic alien species in Germany. Aquatic Invasions (2006) Volume 1, Issue 4: 245–269.

External links
 Molluscs in Germany protected by Law (in German Wikipedia)
 WISIA online, Information System on International Species Conservation by Federal Agency for Nature Conservation

Germany
Molluscs
Germany
Germany